Iberl-Bühne is a theatre in Munich, Bavaria, Germany.

Theatres in Munich